Monetaria is a genus of sea snails, marine gastropod mollusks in the family Cypraeidae, the cowries.

Taxonomy
The generic placement is based on the molecular work of Meyer (2003). Some authors have previously placed species in the genus Erosaria (e.g. caputserpentis, by Lorenz and Hubert, 2000)

Species
Species within the genus Monetaria include:
 Monetaria annulus (Linnaeus, 1758)
 Monetaria caputdraconis (Melvill, 1888)
 Monetaria caputophidii (Schilder, 1927)
 Monetaria caputserpentis (Linnaeus, 1758)
 Monetaria moneta (Linnaeus, 1758)
 Monetaria obvelata (Lamarck, 1810)
Species  brought into synonymy 
 Monetaria britannica Schilder, 1927: synonym of 'Monetaria moneta (Linnaeus, 1758)
 Monetaria camelorum (Rochebrune, 1884): synonym of Monetaria annulus (Linnaeus, 1758)
 Monetaria candidata Sulliotti, 1924: synonym of Monetaria caputserpentis (Linnaeus, 1758)
 Monetaria chionella Sulliotti, 1924: synonym of Monetaria moneta (Linnaeus, 1758)
 Monetaria endua Steadman & Cotton, 1943: synonym of Monetaria moneta (Linnaeus, 1758)
 Monetaria erua Steadman & Cotton, 1943: synonym of Monetaria moneta (Linnaeus, 1758)
 Monetaria etnographica Rochebrunne, 1884: synonym of Monetaria moneta (Linnaeus, 1758)
 Monetaria etolu Steadman & Cotton, 1943: synonym of Monetaria moneta (Linnaeus, 1758)
 Monetaria hamyi Rochebrune, 1884: synonym of Naria turdus (Lamarck, 1810)
 Monetaria harmandiana Rochebrunne, 1884: synonym of Monetaria annulus (Linnaeus, 1758)
 Monetaria harrisi Iredale, 1939: synonym of Monetaria moneta (Linnaeus, 1758)
 Monetaria isomeres Iredale, 1939: synonym of Monetaria moneta (Linnaeus, 1758)
 Monetaria mercatorium Rochebrunne, 1884: synonym of Monetaria moneta (Linnaeus, 1758)
 Monetaria monetoides Iredale, 1939: synonym of Monetaria moneta (Linnaeus, 1758)
 Monetaria perrieri Rochebrune, 1884: synonym of Monetaria obvelata perrieri Rochebrune, 1884 
 Monetaria pleuronectes Rochebrunne, 1884: synonym of Monetaria moneta (Linnaeus, 1758)
 Monetaria pseudomoneta C.-H. Hu, 1992: synonym of Monetaria moneta (Linnaeus, 1758)
 Monetaria rhomboides Schilder & Schilder, 1933: synonym of Monetaria moneta (Linnaeus, 1758)
 Monetaria vestimenti Rochebrunne, 1884: synonym of Monetaria moneta (Linnaeus, 1758)

References

 Meyer C. 2003. Molecular systematics of cowries (Gastropoda: Cypraeidae) and diversification patterns in the tropics. Biological Journal of the Linnean Society, 79: 401-459. page(s): 411
 Lorenz, F. (2017). Cowries. A guide to the gastropod family Cypraeidae. Volume 1, Biology and systematics. Harxheim: ConchBooks. 644 pp

External links
 Iredale, T. (1930). Queensland molluscan notes, No. 2. Memoirs of the Queensland Museum. 10(1): 73-88, pl. 9

Cypraeidae